Józef Stala (born December 6, 1966) is a Polish Catholic priest, theologian, and philosopher.  He was ordained on May 25, 1991.

Biography 
From 1985 until 1991 Stala studied Philosophy and Theology, 1985 and 1986 at the Seminary Gościkowo-Paradyż and from 1986 to 1991 in Tarnów. On May 31, 1991, he finished his studies with Magister of Theology at the Pontifical academy in Kraków (now: Pontifical University of John Paul II). After studies at the Warsaw Theological Academy (now: Cardinal Stefan Wyszyński University in Warsaw he earned at May 15, 1995 the Licentiate, at June 8, 1998 the Doctorate and in 2005 the Habilitation with his book: "Katecheza o małżeństwie i rodzinie w Polsce po Soborze Watykańskim II." (Religious education in the Families in Poland after the Second Vatican Council) at the Pontifical University of John Paul II.

Today (2013) Stala, priest of Tarnów diocese, is Associate Professor of Catechetics and Vice Dean for Research, Development and Cooperation and the Head of the Research Section of Pedagogical and Catechetical Studies at the Pontifical University of John Paul II in Cracow (UPJPII), Theology Faculty, Section in Tarnów (WTST), coordinator of Erasmus Programme at the WTST and editor in chief of the international scientific journal The Person and the Challenges.

Stala was elected into the academic senate to become prorector of science and international cooperation of the Pontifical University in Cracow for the period from 2014 until 2020.

Books 
 E. Osewska, J. Stala: Die katholische Schule zu Beginn des XXI. Jahrhunderts am Beispiel Polens und Englands UKSW, Warszawa 2015,  (print),  (online)
 J. Stala, E. Osewska. Anders erziehen in Polen. Der Erziehungs- und Bildungsbegriff im Kontext eines sich ständig verändernden Europas des XXI. Jahrhunderts. Polihymnia, Tarnów 2009, .
 J. Stala. Familienkatechese in Polen um die Jahrhundertwende. Probleme und Herausforderungen. Biblos, Tarnów 2008, .
 J. Stala. Dzisiejsza młodzież powiedziała, że... : problemy i wyzwania, Kielce 2006, wyd. Jedność, .
 J. Stala. Katecheza o małżeństwie i rodzinie w Polsce po Soborze Watykańskim II : próba oceny,  	Wydawnictwo Diecezji Tarnowskiej Biblos. Tarnów : "Biblos", cop. 2004. 
 J. Stala. Katecheza rodzinna w nauczaniu Kościoła od Soboru Watykańskiego II,  	Tarnów ; Lublin : Wydawnictwo Polihymnia, 2009. 
 J. Stala, Weronika Dryl. Kocham Cię, Jezu : propozycje katechez przedszkolnych dla pięciolatków Tarnów : "Biblos", 2001. 
 J. Stala, Anna Kawa. Miłuję Chrystusa : pomoce do katechez i homilii : ewangelie roku B Kraków : Wydaw. Księży Sercanów, cop. 2002. 
 J. Stala, Anna Kawa. Naśladuję Chrystusa : pomoce do katechez i homilii - Ewangelie roku C Kraków : Wydaw. Księży Sercanów, 2003. 
 J. Stala, Anna Kawa. Poznaję Chrystusa : pomoce do katechez i homilii - Ewangelie roku A  	Kraków : "SCJ", 2001. 
 J. Stala. Ręce mego ojca i usta mojej matki powiedziały mi najwięcej o Bogu : biskupa Piotra Bednarczyka ujęcie katechezy rodzinnej Tarnów ; Lublin : Wydawnictwo Polihymnia, 2011. 
 J. Stala. W kierunku integralnej edukacji religijnej w rodzinie : (próba refleksji nad nauczaniem Jana Pawła II w kontekście polskich uwarunkowań) Tarnów ; Lublin : Wydawnictwo Polihymnia, 2010. 
 J. Stala. Z Ewangelią w trzecie tysiąclecie : Piesza Pielgrzymka Tarnowska, Tarnów - 2001 Tarnów : "Biblos", cop. 2001. 
 J. Stala, Anna Kawa. Z Jezusem szczęśliwi codziennie : Ewangelie dni powszednich. T. 2, Wielki Post i Wielkanoc Kraków : Dom Wydawniczy "Rafael", cop. 2004. 
 J. Stala, Anna Kawa. Z Jezusem szczęśliwi codziennie : Ewangelie dni powszednich. T. 4, Wielki Post i Wielkanoc Kraków : Dom Wydawniczy "Rafael", cop. 2004. 
 J. Stala, Anna Kawa. Z Jezusem szczęśliwi codziennie : Ewangelie dni powszednich. T. 5, Wielki Post i Wielkanoc Kraków : Dom Wydawniczy "Rafael", cop. 2004.

Articles in English 
 J. Stala. Discovering God with Children the Help of R.E. Books in a Polish Context. in Symmetrical communication? Philosophy and Theology in Classrooms across Europe, red. F. Kraft, H. Roose, G. Büttner, Rehburg-Loccum 2011, p. 49-59.
 E. Osewska, J. Stala. Ethical need for authentic fraternity rooted in the Bible. in Biblia a etika: etické dimenzie správania, red. D. Hanesová, Banská Bystrica 2011, wyd. Pedagogická fakulta Univerzity Mateja Bela w Banská Bystrica, p. 134-139.
 J. Stala. Religious Education / Catechesis in the Family: A Basic Psychological and Church Perspective. in Religious Education / Catechesis in the Family. A European Perspective, red. E. Osewska, J. Stala, Warszawa 2010, wyd. UKSW, p. 49-57.
 J. Stala, E. Osewska. Sociological Aspects of Family Religious Education in Poland. in Religious Education / Catechesis in the Family. A European Perspective, red. E. Osewska, J. Stala, Warszawa 2010, wyd. UKSW, p. 167-177.
 E. Osewska, J. Stala: Religious Education / Catechesis in the Family. A European Perspective. UKSW, Warszawa 2010.

Lectures of J. Stala in English 
 Charles University in Prague / Univerzita Karlova v Praze, Katolická teologická fakulta, Katedra pastorálních oborů, Praga, September 12, 2012,  international scientific conference The Powerful Learning Environments: Religious Education in the post-modern reality and Modern Family Catechesis
  Faculty of Pedagogics Univerzity Mateja Bela w Banská Bystrica, March 1, 2011, International Conference: Bible and Ethics: Ethical Dimensions of Behaviour: Ethical need for authentic fraternity rooted in the Bible 
 The Catholic University in Ružomberok/Katolícka Univerzita v Rużomberku, February 28, 2011: Models of modern education
 Charles University in Prague/ Univerzita Karlova v Praze, April 10, 2010: How do we find God with the help of Religious education books?
 Charles University in Prague/ Univerzita Karlova v Praze, April 8, 2010: Modern Christian Formation
 Univerza v Ljubljani / University of Ljubljana, March 25, 2010: Selected Problems of Modern Youth: with Special Emphasis on Group Formation
 Univerza v Ljubljani / University of Ljubljana, March 25, 2010, International Conference: Religious Education and Catechesis in Europe with a Special Focus on Poland, England and Slovenia: Religious Education and Catechesis in Poland
 The Catholic University in Ružomberok/Katolícka Univerzita v Rużomberku, March 23, 2010: Accompany the youth in the process of their formation
 The Catholic University in Ružomberok/Katolícka Univerzita v Rużomberku, March 22, 2010: Models of modern education
 Rehburg - Loccum (around Hannover), German, September 6–9, 2009, International Conference: Theologising with Children: How do we find God with children with the help of Religious education programme?

Articles in German 
 J. Stala. Der Mensch als Person: Die bestimmende Grundlage für Johannes Paul II. in seinem Bild von der Familie in „The Person and the Challenges” 2 (2012) No. 2, p. 41-59.
 J. Stala. Die Transzendenz als bestimmendes Merkmal der Person in der Anthropologie und der Pädagogik Johannes Pauls II. in „The Person and the Challenges” 2 (2012) No. 1, p. 61-75.
 J. Stala. Die personalistische Grundlage für Erziehung und Bildung in der katholischen Schule in „Angelicum“ 88 (2011), p. 997-1007.
 J. Stala. Ausgewählte Aspekte von Erziehung und Bildung an der katholischen Schule in „Angelicum“ 88 (2011), p. 751-761.
 J. Stala. Impulse Johannes Pauls II. zur Religionserziehung in der Familie in „Studia Bobolanum“ 4 (2011), p. 153-163.
 J. Stala. Die Religionserziehung in der Familie im Kontext der Gegebenheiten in Polen in „Biuletyn Edukacji Medialnej” (2011) No. 1, p. 173-183.
 J. Stala. Wie schön ist es, in der Reichweite des Wortes Gottes und der Eucharistie zu leben. Eine Betrachtung zur eucharistischen Bildung der jungen Menschen in „Theologica” 46 (2011) 2, p. 311-322.
 J. Stala. Internet - Church - Communication in „Studia Pastoralne” (2011) No. 7, p. 566-574.
 J. Stala. Aspekte der Aktivitäten der akademischen Mitarbeiter an der Theologischen Fakultät, Sektion Tarnów, im Dienst der Wissenschaft. in „The Person and the Challenges” 1 (2011) No. 2, p. 11-19.
 J. Stala. Die Person und die Herausforderungen der Gegenwart im Licht der Nachfolge und der Lehre des Heiligen Vaters Johannes Pauls II „The Person and the Challenges“ - ein internationales wissenschaftliches Periodikum. in „The Person and the Challenges” 1 (2011) No. 1, p. 13-23.
 J. Stala. Grundlagen der Religionserziehung in der Familie im Kontext zu den Gegebenheiten der heutigen Zeit. „Studia Teologiczno-Historyczne Śląska Opolskiego“ (2010) No. 30, p. 263-272.
 J. Stala. Pädagogisch-katechetische Implikationen aus den Anregungen Johannes Pauls II. für die sakramentale Bildung. Zehn Jahre Gymnasialreform in Polen. „Studia Bobolanum” (2010) No. 4, p. 155-167.
 J. Stala. Lehrpläne und Schulbücher für den Religionsunterricht an den Staatlichen Grundschulen in Polen. „Bogoslovni vestnik“ 70 (2010) No. 3, p. 405-414.
 J. Stala. Lasst uns voller Hoffnung vorwärts gehen. Pädagogisch-katechetische Aspekte, wie der Christ die Zeichen der Zeit in der gegenwärtigen Welt aufnimmt. „Roczniki liturgiczne“ 1 (56) (2009), p. 435-447.

References

External links 
 
 The Person and the Challenges
 ks. prof. dr hab. Józef Stala
 
 ks prof dr hab Józef Stala UPJPII Kraków, 2021
 ks. prof. dr hab. Józef Stala (UJP II, Kraków) - Godność osoby fundamentem wychowania, 2020, The dignity of the person is the foundation of education

1966 births
Living people
Polish Roman Catholic theologians
Catholic philosophers
Roman Catholic writers